The 2019–20 Cymru North was the inaugural season of the Cymru North, which is in the second level of the Welsh football pyramid. The season had been scheduled to finish on 25 April but due to the COVID-19 pandemic no games were played after 7 March. In May 2020 the Cymru North was officially ended after consultation between the Football Association of Wales and the clubs. Prestatyn Town were confirmed as champions but because they failed to gain a Tier 1 licence, runners-up Flint Town United were promoted to the Cymru Premier. Porthmadog, Corwen and Llanfair United were relegated.

The league consisted of seventeen teams with the champions promoted to the Cymru Premier and the bottom four teams relegated to a regional division of FAW League One.

The season commenced on 16 August 2019 and had been scheduled to conclude on 25 April 2020.

Effects of the COVID-19 pandemic 
On 13 March 2020, all games were suspended due to the COVID-19 pandemic and no further games were played in the campaign. On 19 May 2020, the league was cancelled. Prestatyn Town were declared the champions.

Teams
The inaugural season consisted of twelve teams from the now defunct Cymru Alliance, which are Bangor City, Buckley Town, Conwy Borough, Flint Town United, Gresford Athletic, Guilsfield, Llanrhaeadr-ym-Mochnant, Penrhyncoch, Porthmadog, Prestatyn Town, Rhyl and Ruthin Town.

Joining them were Llandudno who were relegated from Cymru Premier, Mid Wales Football League champions, Llanfair United, Welsh Alliance League champions, Llangefni Town and Welsh National League (Wrexham Area) runners-up, Corwen.

In addition and after a 35-year absence, Colwyn Bay rejoined the Welsh football league and were placed in the Cymru North. From English Northern Premier League Division One West.

On 5 August 2019 Bangor City were suspended from playing competitive matches pending an arbitration hearing on 16 August following allegations that they fielded an ineligible player the previous season. On 16 August 2019, Bangor City won their appeal against the FAW in Birmingham and were reinstated the 21 points that were originally deducted from them in the 2018–19 Cymru Alliance season  and were cleared to start the season in Cymru North.

Grounds and locations

League table
The Cymru North table as it stood after the league was halted in early March, 2020 due to the COVID-19 pandemic.

Positions by round 
The table lists the positions of teams after completion of each round.

Results

Top scorers

Final League table
On 19 May 2020, the league was cancelled due to the COVID-19 pandemic and an unweighted points per game method was applied to determine the final standings. The  Football Association of Wales said a decision on promotion and relegation between leagues would be made in due course.

Prestatyn Town were refused a Tier One licence in April 2020 to allow them to compete in the Cymru Premier for season 2020-21 and their subsequent appeal was unsuccessful.
Flint Town United were awarded Tier 1 Licence following a successful appeal.

Flint's promotion to the Cymru Premier was confirmed by the FAW on 16 June 2020. It was also confirmed that Porthmadog, Corwen and Llanfair United would be relegated to Tier 3.

Rhyl entered administration in April 2020 after failing to find a £175,000 investment, with the club's directors cited the financial impact of the COVID-19 pandemic as a reason for entering administration and the club's results were expunged.

References

2019–20 in Welsh football
Cymru North seasons